Field Marshal Sir Claude John Eyre Auchinleck,  (21 June 1884 – 23 March 1981), was a British Army commander during the Second World War. He was a career soldier who spent much of his military career in India, where he rose to become Commander-in-Chief of the Indian Army by early 1941. In July 1941 he was appointed Commander-in-Chief of the Middle East Theatre, but after initial successes, the war in North Africa turned against the British, and he was relieved of the post in 1942 during the North African campaign.

In June 1943, he was once again appointed Commander-in-Chief, India, where his support through the organisation of supply, maintenance and training for William Slim's Fourteenth Army played an important role in its success. He served as Commander-in-Chief, India, until the Partition in 1947, when he assumed the role of Supreme Commander of all British forces in India and Pakistan until late 1948.

Early life and career
Born at 89 Victoria Road in Aldershot, Hampshire, the son of Colonel John Claud Alexander Auchinleck and Mary Eleanor (Eyre) Auchinleck, Auchinleck attended Eagle House School at Crowthorne and then Wellington College on scholarships. After attending the Royal Military College, Sandhurst, Auchinleck was commissioned as an unattached second lieutenant in the Indian Army on 21 January 1903, and joined the 62nd Punjabis in April 1904. He soon learned several Indian languages, and, able to speak fluently with his soldiers, he absorbed a knowledge of local dialects and customs: this familiarity engendered a lasting mutual respect, enhanced by his own personality.

He was promoted to lieutenant on 21 April 1905, and then spent the next two years in Tibet and Sikkim before moving to Benares in 1907 where he caught diphtheria. After briefly serving with the Royal Inniskilling Fusiliers at Aldershot he returned to Benares in 1909 and became adjutant of the 62nd Punjabis with promotion to captain on 21 January 1912. Auchinleck was an active freemason.

First World War
Auchinleck saw active service in the First World War and was deployed with his regiment to defend the Suez Canal: in February 1915 he was in action against the Turks at Ismaïlia. His regiment moved into Aden to counter the Turkish threat there in July 1915. The 6th Indian Division, of which the 62nd Punjabis were a part, was landed at Basra on 31 December 1915 for the Mesopotamian campaign. In July 1916 Auchinleck was promoted acting major and made second in command of his battalion. He took part in a series of fruitless attacks on the Turks at the Battle of Hanna in January 1916 and was one of the few British officers in his regiment to survive these actions.

He became acting commanding officer of his battalion in February 1917 and led his regiment at the Second Battle of Kut in February 1917 and the Fall of Baghdad in March 1917. Having been mentioned in despatches and having received the Distinguished Service Order in 1917 for his service in Mesopotamia, he was promoted to the substantive rank of major on 21 January 1918, to temporary lieutenant-colonel on 23 May 1919 and to brevet lieutenant-colonel on 15 November 1919 for his "distinguished service in Southern and Central Kurdistan" on the recommendation of the Commander-in-Chief of the Mesopotamia Expeditionary Force.

Between the world wars
Auchinleck attended the Staff College, Quetta, between 1920 and 1921. He married Jessie Stewart in 1921. Jessie had been born in 1900 in Tacoma, Washington, to Alexander Stewart, head of the Blue Funnel Line that plied the west coast of the United States. When he died about 1919, their mother took her, her twin brother Alan and her younger brother Hepburne back to Bun Rannoch, the family estate at Innerhadden in Perthshire. Holidaying at Grasse on the French Riviera, Auchinleck, who was on leave from India at the time, met Jessie on the tennis courts. She was a high-spirited, blue-eyed beauty. Things moved quickly, and they were married within five months. Sixteen years younger than Auchinleck, Jessie became known as 'the little American girl' in India, but adapted readily to life there. They had no children.

Auchinleck became temporary Deputy Assistant Quartermaster-General at Army Headquarters in February 1923 and then second-in-command of his regiment, which in the 1923 reorganisation of the Indian Army had become the 1st Punjab Regiment, in September 1925. He attended the Imperial Defence College in 1927 and, having been promoted to lieutenant-colonel on 21 January 1929 he was appointed to command his regiment. Promoted to full colonel on 1 February 1930 with seniority from 15 November 1923, he became an instructor at the Staff College, Quetta in February 1930 where he remained until April 1933.

He was promoted to temporary brigadier on 1 July 1933 and given command of the Peshawar Brigade, which was active in the pacification of the adjacent tribal areas during the Mohmand and Bajaur Operations between July and October 1933: during his period of command he was mentioned in despatches. He led a second punitive expedition during the Second Mohmand Campaign in August 1935 for which he was again mentioned in despatches, promoted to major-general on 30 November 1935 and appointed a Companion of the Order of the Star of India on 8 May 1936.

On leaving his brigade command in April 1936, Auchinleck was on the unemployed list (on half pay) until September 1936 when he was appointed Deputy Chief of the General Staff and Director of Staff Duties in Delhi. He was then appointed to command the Meerut District in India in July 1938. In 1938 Auchinleck was appointed to chair a committee to consider the modernisation, composition and re-equipment of the British Indian Army: the committee's recommendations formed the basis of the 1939 Chatfield Report which outlined the transformation of the Indian Army – it grew from 183,000 in 1939 to over 2,250,000 men by the end of the war.

Second World War

Norway 1940
On the outbreak of war, Auchinleck was appointed to command the Indian 3rd Infantry Division, but in January 1940 was summoned to the United Kingdom to command IV Corps, the only time in the war that a wholly British corps was commanded by an Indian Army officer. He received promotion to acting Lieutenant-General on 1 February 1940 and to the substantive rank of Lieutenant-General on 16 March 1940. In May 1940 Auchinleck took over command of the Anglo-French ground forces during the Norwegian campaign, a military operation that was doomed to fail.

After the fall of Norway, in June 1940 he briefly commanded V Corps before becoming General Officer Commanding-in-Chief, Southern Command, in July 1940, where he had an uneasy relationship with his subordinate Bernard Montgomery, the new V Corps commander. Montgomery later wrote: "In the 5th Corps I first served under Auchinleck... I cannot recall that we ever agreed on anything."

India and Iraq January–May 1941
Promoted to full general on 26 December 1940, Auchinleck was recalled to India in January 1941 to become Commander-in-Chief, India, in which position he also was appointed to the Executive Council of the Viceroy of India and appointed ADC General to the King, which ceremonial position he held until after the end of the War.

In April 1941, RAF Habbaniya was threatened by the new pro-Axis regime of Rashid Ali. This large Royal Air Force station was west of Baghdad in Iraq and General Archibald Wavell, Commander-in-Chief Middle East Command, was reluctant to intervene, despite the urgings of Winston Churchill, because of his pressing commitments in the Western Desert and Greece. Auchinleck, however, acted decisively, sending a battalion of the King's Own Royal Regiment by air to Habbaniya and shipping the Indian 10th Infantry Division by sea to Basra. Wavell was prevailed upon by London to send Habforce, a relief column, from the British Mandate of Palestine but by the time it arrived in Habbaniya on 18 May the Anglo-Iraqi War was virtually over.

North Africa July 1941 – August 1942

Following the see-saw of Allied and Axis successes and reverses in North Africa, Auchinleck was appointed to succeed General Sir Archibald Wavell as Commander-in-Chief Middle East Command in July 1941; Wavell took up Auchinleck's post as Commander-in-Chief of the Indian Army, swapping jobs with him.

As Commander-in-Chief Middle East, Auchinleck, based in Cairo, held responsibility not just for North Africa but also for Persia and the Middle East. He launched an offensive in the Western Desert, Operation Crusader, in November 1941: despite some tactical reverses during the fighting which resulted in Auchinleck replacing the Eighth Army commander Alan Cunningham with Neil Ritchie, by the end of December the besieged garrison of Tobruk had been relieved and Rommel obliged to withdraw to El Agheila. Auchinleck appears to have believed that the enemy had been defeated, writing on 12 January 1942 that the Axis forces were "beginning to feel the strain" and were "hard pressed".

In fact the Axis forces had managed to withdraw in good order and a few days after Auchinleck's optimistic appreciation, having reorganised and been reinforced, struck at the dispersed and weakened British forces, driving them back to the Gazala positions near Tobruk. The British Chief of the Imperial General Staff (CIGS), General Sir Alan Brooke, wrote in his diary that it was "nothing less than bad generalship on the part of Auchinleck. He has been overconfident and has believed everything his overoptimistic [DMI] Shearer has told him". Brooke commented that Auchinleck "could have been one of the finest of commanders" but lacked the ability to select the men to serve him. Brooke sent him one of his best armoured division commanders Richard McCreery, whose advice was ignored in favour of Dorman-Smith's.

Rommel's attack at the Battle of Gazala of 26 May 1942 resulted in a significant defeat for the British. Auchinleck's appreciation of the situation written to Ritchie on 20 May had suggested that the armoured reserves be concentrated in a position suitable to meet both a flanking attack around the south of the front or a direct attack through the centre (which was the likelihood more favoured by Auchinleck). In the event, Ritchie chose a more dispersed and rearward positioning of his two armoured divisions and when the attack in the centre came, it proved to be a diversion and the main attack, by Rommel's armoured formations, came round the southern flank. Poor initial positioning and subsequent handling and coordination of Allied formations by Ritchie and his corps commanders resulted in their heavy defeat and the Eighth Army retreating into Egypt; Tobruk fell to the Axis on 21 June 1942.

On 24 June Auchinleck stepped in to take direct command of the Eighth Army, having lost confidence in Neil Ritchie's ability to control and direct his forces. Auchinleck discarded Ritchie's plan to stand at Mersa Matruh, deciding to fight only a delaying action there, while withdrawing to the more easily defendable position at El Alamein. Here Auchinleck tailored a defence that took advantage of the terrain and the fresh troops at his disposal, stopping the exhausted German/Italian advance in the First Battle of El Alamein. Enjoying a considerable superiority of material and men over the weak German/Italian forces, Auchinleck organised a series of counter-attacks. Poorly conceived and badly coordinated, these attacks achieved little.

"The Auk", as he was known, appointed a number of senior commanders who proved to be unsuitable for their positions, and command arrangements were often characterised by bitter personality clashes. Auchinleck was an Indian Army officer and was criticised for apparently having little direct experience or understanding of British and Dominion troops. His controversial chief of operations, Major-General Dorman-Smith, was regarded with considerable distrust by many of the senior commanders in Eighth Army. By July 1942 Auchinleck had lost the confidence of Dominion commanders and relations with his British commanders had become strained.

Like his foe Rommel (and his predecessor Wavell and successor Montgomery), Auchinleck was subjected to constant political interference, having to weather a barrage of hectoring telegrams and instructions from Prime Minister Churchill throughout late 1941 and the spring and summer of 1942. Churchill constantly sought an offensive from Auchinleck, and was downcast at the military reverses in Egypt and Cyrenaica. Churchill was desperate for some sort of British victory before the planned Allied landings in North Africa, Operation Torch, scheduled for November 1942. He badgered Auchinleck immediately after the Eighth Army had all but exhausted itself after the first battle of El Alamein. Churchill and the Chief of the Imperial General Staff, Sir Alan Brooke, flew to Cairo in early August 1942 to meet Auchinleck, where it emerged he had lost the confidence of both men. He was replaced as Commander-in-Chief Middle East Command by General Sir Harold Alexander (later Field Marshal The Earl Alexander of Tunis).

Joseph M. Horodyski and Maurice Remy both praise Auchinleck as an underrated military leader who contributed the most to the successful defence of El Alamein and consequently the final defeat of Rommel in Africa. The two historians also criticize Churchill for the unreasonable decision to put the blame on Auchinleck and to relieve him.

India 1942–1945

Churchill offered Auchinleck command of the newly created Persia and Iraq Command (this having been separated from Alexander's command), but Auchinleck declined this post, as he believed that separating the area from the Middle East Command was not good policy and the new arrangements would not be workable. He set his reasons out in his letter to the Chief of the Imperial General Staff dated 14 August 1942. Instead he returned to India, where he spent almost a year "unemployed" before in June 1943 being again appointed Commander-in-Chief of the Indian Army,

General Wavell meanwhile having been appointed Viceroy, on this appointment it was announced that responsibility for the prosecution of the war with Japan would move from the Commander-in-Chief India to a newly created South East Asia Command. However, the appointment of the new command's Supreme Commander, Acting Vice Admiral Lord Louis Mountbatten, was not announced until August 1943 and until Mountbatten could set up his headquarters and assume control (in November), Auchinleck retained responsibility for operations in India and Burma while conducting a review and revision of Allied plans based on the decisions taken by the Allied Combined Chiefs of Staff at the Quadrant Conference, which ended in August.

Following Mountbatten's arrival, Auchinleck's India Command (which had equal status with South East Asia Command in the military hierarchy) was responsible for the internal security of India, the defence of the North West Frontier and the buildup of India as a base, including most importantly the reorganisation of the Indian Army, the training of forces destined for SEAC and the lines of communication carrying men and material to the forward areas and to China. Auchinleck made the supply of Fourteenth Army, with probably the worst lines of communication of the war, his immediate priority; as Sir William Slim, commander of the Fourteenth Army, was later to write:

Divorce
Auchinleck suffered a personal disappointment when his wife Jessie left him for his friend, Air Chief Marshal Sir Richard Peirse. Peirse and Auchinleck had been students together at the Imperial Defence College, but that was long before. Peirse was now Allied Air Commander-in-Chief, South-East Asia, and also based in India. The affair became known to Mountbatten in early 1944, and he passed the information to the Chief of the RAF, Sir Charles Portal, hoping that Peirse would be recalled. The affair was common knowledge by September 1944, and Peirse was neglecting his duties. Mountbatten sent Peirse and Lady Auchinleck back to England on 28 November 1944, where they lived together at a Brighton hotel. Peirse had his marriage dissolved, and Auchinleck obtained a divorce in 1946. Auchinleck was reportedly very badly affected. According to his sister, he was never the same after the break-up. He always carried a photograph of Jessie in his wallet even after the divorce.

There is scholarly dispute whether Auchinleck was homosexual. His biographer, Philip Warner, addressed the rumours but dismissed them; however historian Ronald Hyam has alleged that "sexually based moral-revulsion" was the reason for Montgomery's inability to get on with Auchinleck, and further, that Auchinleck was "let off with a high-level warning" over his relationships with Indian boys.

Partition of India and later years

Auchinleck continued as Commander-in-Chief of the Indian Army after the end of the war helping, though much against his own convictions, to prepare the future Indian and Pakistani armies for the Partition of India: in November 1945 he was forced to commute the more serious judicial sentences awarded against officers of the Indian National Army in face of growing unease and unrest both within the Indian population, and the British Indian Army. On 1 June 1946 he was promoted to field marshal, but he refused to accept a peerage, lest he be thought associated with a policy (i.e. Partition) that he thought fundamentally dishonourable.

Sending a report to the British Government on 28 September 1947, Field Marshal Auchinleck wrote: "I have no hesitation, whatever, in affirming that the present Indian Cabinet are implacably determined to do all in their power to prevent the establishment of the Dominion of Pakistan on firm basis." He stated in the second, political part of his assessment, "Since 15th August, the situation has steadily deteriorated and the Indian leaders, cabinet ministers, civil officials and others have persistently tried to obstruct the work of partition of the armed forces."

When partition was effected in August 1947, Auchinleck was appointed Supreme Commander of all British forces remaining in India and Pakistan and remained in this role until the winding up and closure of the Supreme H.Q. at the end of November 1947. This marked his effective retirement from the army (although technically field marshals in the British Army never retire, remaining on the active list on half pay). He left India on 1 December.

After a brief period in Italy in connection with an unsuccessful business project, Auchinleck retired to London, where he occupied himself with a number of charitable and business interests and became a respectably skilled watercolour painter. In 1960 he settled in Beccles in the county of Suffolk, remaining there for seven years until, at the age of eighty-four, he decided to emigrate and set up home in Marrakesh, where he died on 23 March 1981.

Memorials

Auchinleck is buried in Ben M'Sik European Cemetery, Casablanca, in the Commonwealth War Graves Commission plot in the cemetery, next to the grave of Raymond Steed who was the second youngest non-civilian Commonwealth casualty of the Second World War.

A memorial plaque was erected in the crypt of St Paul's Cathedral. A bronze statue of Auchinleck can be seen on Broad Street adjacent to Auchinleck House, Five Ways, Birmingham.

Awards and decorations
 Knight Grand Cross of the Order of the Bath (1 January 1945)
 Companion of the Order of the Bath (3 July 1934) Mohmand operations 7 October 1933
 Knight Grand Commander of the Order of the Indian Empire (20 December 1940)
 Companion of the Order of the Star of India (8 May 1936) Mohmand operations 8 October 1935
 Distinguished Service Order (3 June 1917)
 Officer of the Order of the British Empire (Military Division) (3 June 1919)
 Mention in Despatches, twice (World War I and 3 July 1934 – Mohmand operations)
 Croix de Guerre with Palm (France, 1918 and 1949)
 Chief Commander of the Legion of Merit (United States, 23 July 1948)
 Virtuti Militari, 5th class (Poland, 15 May 1942)
 Member First Class Order of the Star of Nepal (Nepal)
 War Cross (Czechoslovakia, 1944)
 Order of the Star of Nepal (Nepal, 1945)
 Knight Grand Cross of Order of St Olav (Norway, 19 March 1948)

Publications
. 
(Auchinleck's Official Middle East Despatch published after the war in )
. 
(Auchinleck's Official Middle East Despatch published after the war in )
. 
(Auchinleck's Official Indo-Burma Despatch published after the war in )

References
Notes

Citations

Sources

Further reading

External links

Auchinleck Papers at John Rylands Library, Manchester

Indian Army Officers 1939−1945
Generals of World War II

 

 
 

 
 

 

 
 

 
 

1884 births
1981 deaths
Military personnel from Aldershot
People educated at Wellington College, Berkshire
Graduates of the Royal Military College, Sandhurst
Indian Army generals of World War II
British Commanders-in-Chief of India
Indian Army personnel of World War I
British field marshals
Academics of the Staff College, Quetta
Indian National Army trials
Companions of the Distinguished Service Order
Companions of the Order of the Star of India
Knights Grand Commander of the Order of the Indian Empire
Knights Grand Cross of the Order of the Bath
Officers of the Order of the British Empire
Chief Commanders of the Legion of Merit
Recipients of the Silver Cross of the Virtuti Militari
Recipients of the Czechoslovak War Cross
Recipients of the Order of the Star of Nepal
Grand Officiers of the Légion d'honneur
Recipients of the Croix de Guerre 1914–1918 (France)
Recipients of the Croix de Guerre 1939–1945 (France)
Ulster Scots people
British military personnel of the Second Mohmand Campaign
Graduates of the Royal College of Defence Studies
Graduates of the Staff College, Quetta
Freemasons of the United Grand Lodge of England
Burials at Ben M'Sik European Cemetery
British Indian Army generals
People educated at Eagle House School
Members of the Council of the Governor General of India
Pakistan Command and Staff College alumni